Blue Virgin Isles is the fifth studio album and international debut album by Swedish singer-songwriter Ted Gärdestad, released on November 1978 by Epic Records in the UK and Polar Music in Scandinavia.

Background

Recording
The Blue Virgin Isles album was mainly recorded in Hollywood, California with a large number of noted American and English musicians, among them Jim Keltner, Jay Graydon, Lee Ritenour, Fred Tackett, James Newton Howard, Dr. John, John Mayall, Chuck Domanico, Mike Melvoin, four of the future members of Toto; Jeff Porcaro, Steve Porcaro, David Hungate and Steve Lukather, and backing vocals by David Cassidy, Venetta Fields and Sherlie Matthews. The album was produced by Norwegian-American Eirik W. Wangberg, also known as Eirik The Norwegian, a nickname given to him by Paul McCartney during the sessions for McCartney's 1971 album Ram. The Blue Virgin Isles recordings began in the United States in the autumn of 1977 and were completed with some additional overdubs made at Bastun Studio, Marcus Music, and KMH Studios, Stockholm in the summer of 1978.

Promotion and reception
The album spawned two single releases, "Take Me Back To Hollywood" and "Love, You're Making All The Fools". "Take Me Back To Hollywood" was a re-recording of Swedish hit single "Chapeau-Claque" from the preceding album Franska Kort, produced by Benny Andersson and Björn Ulvaeus, Michael B. Tretow and Gärdestad himself. The Blue Virgin Isles album was promoted by a guest appearance on ABBA's BBC TV special ABBA in Switzerland a.k.a. Snow Time Special, filmed in Leysin and broadcast worldwide in April 1979. Despite this and a number of other personal appearances in West Germany, The Netherlands, the UK, the US and the Scandinavian countries in the winter of 1978 and the spring of 1979 as well as receiving generally favourable reviews by music critics, Blue Virgin Isles was only a moderate commercial success; in Sweden the album peaked at number 29 on the Albums Chart and only spent one week on the chart.

Eurovision and release
After having won the 1979 Melodifestivalen, the Swedish pre-selections for the Eurovision Song Contest, with the song "Satellit"/"Satellite" in February 1979 the Blue Virgin Isles album was re-released both internationally and domestically to include this track. The second Polar Music edition of the album features both the Swedish and English language versions of the song. "Satellit" received a disappointing eight points in the contest, held on 31 March 1979 in Jerusalem, and finished seventeenth out of nineteen participating entries, making it Sweden's second lowest placing in the contest up until that point. Despite the added Eurovision exposure, the second attempt to promote the Blue Virgin Isles album consequently met with the same result as the first, both internationally and in Sweden.

When Gärdestad made his comeback on the music scene in 1993 he re-recorded a Swedish language version of the title track "Blue Virgin Isles", entitled "Himlen Är Oskyldigt Blå" ("The Sky Is Innocently Blue"), for career retrospective Kalendarium 1972-93, then using the original backing track.

Blue Virgin Isles was released on CD in 2009, as part of the 8-CD box set Helt Nära Dig - Samlade Album. It was also released as a separate download.

Track listing
Music: Ted Gärdestad, lyrics: Kenneth Gärdestad

Side A:
"505 To Casablanca" - 3:49
 Arranged by Larry Muhoberac
 Solo: Abe Most, clarinet
"Blue Virgin Isles" - 4:57
 Arranged by James Newton Howard
 Strings arranged By Gene Page
 Solo: Jay Graydon, electric guitar
"Love, You're Makin' All The Fools" - 3:26
 Arranged by Jai Winding*
"Baby Blue Eyes" - 2:36
 Arranged by George Tipton
 Solo: Abe Most, clarinet
 "Wanna Live - Got To Give" - 4:18
 Arranged by Gene Page*
 Solo: Stella Castellucci, harp

Side B:
"Take Me Back To Hollywood" - 4:18
 Original title: "Chapeau-Claque", from 1976 album Franska Kort
 Arranged by George Tipton
"Back In The Business" - 3:48
 Arranged by Jai Winding*
 Solo: Jay Graydon, electric guitar
"Puddle Of Pain" - 3:18
 Arranged by Larry Muhoberac
 Solo: Jim Horn, flute
"Love Lies Free" - 4:11
 Arranged by Jai Winding
 Solo: Steve Lukather, electric guitar
"Just For The Money" - 3:59
 Arranged by Gene Page*
 Solos: John Mayall, harmonica and Abe Most, clarinet

Additional tracks, 1979 re-release
 International editions: "Satellite", track A1.
 Scandinavian edition: "Satellit" (Swedish version), track A1 + "Satellite", track B6.

Personnel
Mostly adapted from Tidal.

 Ted Gärdestad - lead vocals, piano, guitar
 Jeff Porcaro - drums, percussion
 Jim Keltner - drums
 David Hungate - bass guitar
 Ray Brown - bass
 Bob Glaub - bass
 Jai Winding - bass, keyboards, synthesizers
 Jay Graydon - guitars
 Lee Ritenour - guitars
 Steve Lukather - guitars
 Fred Tackett - guitars
 John Collins - guitars
 Larry Muhoberac - keyboards
 Mike Melvoin - keyboards
 James Newton Howard - keyboards
 Dr. John - keyboards
 Victor Feldman - percussion
 Jerry Williams - percussion
 Hal Blaine - percussion
 Jim Keltner - percussion
 Gary Coleman - percussion
 Al Hendrickson - ukulele, banjo
 Steve Porcaro - synthesizers
 Emil Richards - cymbalum
 John Mayall - harmonica
 Jim Keltner - heartbeat and bicycle bell
 Steve Madaio - trumpet
 Bob Fowler - trumpet
 Gene Goe - trumpet
 Jerry Hey - trumpet
 Cappy Lewis - trumpet
 Dick Hyde - trombone
 Tommy Shephard - trombone
 Abe Most - woodwinds
 John Lowe - woodwinds
 Jim Horn  - woodwinds
 Buddy Collette  - woodwinds
 David Luell  - woodwinds
 Ted Nash  - woodwinds
 Willie Schwartz  - woodwinds
 Gary Herbig  - woodwinds
 Dave Duke - french horns
 Bob Henderson - French horns
 Harry Bluestone - concert master, strings
 Israel Baker - violin
 Arnold Belnick - violin
 Isabelle Daskoff - violin
 Ron Folsom - violin
 Bill Hymanson - violin
 Anatol Kaminksy - violin
 Jake Krachmalnik - violin
 Bernie Kundell - violin
 Betty La Magna - violin
 Erno Neufeld - violin
 Don Palmer - violin
 Stan Plummer - violin
 Nat Ross - violin
 Henry Roth - violin
 Jack Shulman - violin
 Marshall Sosson - violin
 Joe Stepansky - violin
 Pam Goldsmith - viola
 Allan Harshman - viola
 Garry Nuttycombe - viola
 Dave Schwartz - viola
 Julianna Buffum - cello
 Jesse Ehrlich - cello
 Armand Kaproff - cello
 Dennis Karmazyn - cello
 Ray Kramer - cello
 Chuck Domanico - bass
 Arni Egilsson - bass
 Stella Castellucci - harp
 Jon Joyce - background vocals and clapping
 David Cassidy - background vocals and clapping
 Venetta Fields - background vocals and clapping
 Sherlie Matthews - background vocals and clapping
 Stan Farber - background vocals and clapping
 Jackie Ward - background vocals and clapping
 Mitch Gordon - background vocals and clapping
 Jim Haas - background vocals and clapping
 Jai Winding - background vocals and clapping
 Alix Wangberg - background vocals and clapping
 Tere Mansfield - background vocals and clapping
 John Baylor - background vocals and clapping
 Sally Stevens - background vocals and clapping
 Jean King - background vocals and clapping
 Anita James - background vocals and clapping
 Bili Thedford - background vocals and clapping
 Jim Keltner - background vocals and clapping
 John Mayall  - background vocals and clapping
 Dr. John - background vocals and clapping

Production
 Produced by Eirik W. Wangberg
 Recorded at: Sounds Labs Inc., Hollywood, Bastun Studios AB, Stockholm, Marcus Music AB, Stockholm, Capitol Studios, Hollywood; KMH Studio AB, Stockholm; Whitney Studios, Glendale, Western Recorders, Hollywood; Hollywood Sound Recorders, Hollywood
 Sound engineers: Eirik W. Wangberg, Ron Hitchcock, Val Garay, Armin Steiner
 Assistant engineers: Linda Tyler, Olle Ramm, Christer Berg, Dennis Cook, Lennart Karlsmyr, Åke Grahn, Cecil Jones, Don Henderson, Bob Mocler, Ed Perry.
 Mastering: Wally Traugott at Capitol Studios, Hollywood
 Musician contractor: Frank DeCaro
 Art direction: David Larkham
 Cover design: David Larkham and Eirik W. Wangberg
 Front & back cover photographs: Yoshi Ohara for Barry Levine Studios
 Inner sleeve photography: Barry Levine & Torbjörn Calvero
 Thank You: Janne Schaffer, Randy Edelman, Thom Rotelia, Ben Benay, Scotty Edwards, Ralph Grierson, Howard Weiss, Peggy Steiner, Annie Street, Virginia Berger, John Sands, Ned Forsythe, Robert Lamoureux, Jon Joyce, Steve Kelman, Mikke Tretow and to Stig Anderson, ABBA, and the Polar family. Special thanks to Alix Wangberg whose cheerful spirit and lyrical talent helped when times were rough and no words were in the air. /TED & KEN

Personnel and production "Satellit"/"Satellite"
 Producers: Janne Schaffer & Ted Gärdestad
 Musicians: Stefan Nilsson, Janne Schaffer, Mike Watson, Roger Palm, Malando Gassama & Lars Samuelsson
 String arrangement: Lars Samuelsson
 Backing vocals: Rose-Marie Gröning, Liza Öhman, Diana Nunez, Lennart Sjöholm & Peter Lundblad
 Recorded at Polar Studios, Stockholm

Release history
 1978 Polar Music POLS 284 (Scandinavia)
 1978 RCA Records VPL1 4118 (Australia)
 1979 Polar Music POLS 300 (Scandinavia, re-release including "Satellit" and "Satellite")
 1979 Epic Records 83653 (UK, re-release including "Satellite")
 1979 Polydor Records 2344 121 (West Germany, The Netherlands & Portugal, re-release including "Satellite")
 1979 Carnaby (Spain, re-release including "Satellite")
 1979 Discomate DSP 5111 (Japan, re-release including "Satellite")

Charts

References

External links and sources 

 Eirik Wangberg's official site. 
 Detailed Ted Gärdestad discography 
 Artist Direct biography 
 MSN Music biography 
 Allmusic biography and discography []

1978 albums
Ted Gärdestad albums